Ivy wearing a fall, Boston is a 1973 gelatin silver print photograph by the American photographer Nan Goldin. It is one of the many black-and-white photographs that Goldin took of her friends between 1972 and 1974. Depicting Goldin’s close friend Ivy with head turned back, the photograph measures 19.875 in x 15.875 in (50.5 cm x 40.3 cm). It was purchased by Solomon R. Guggenheim Museum in New York in 2002.

Background

Goldin started taking black-and-white photographs as a teenager in Boston, before she moved to New York City in 1978. Goldin had no prior formal education in photography, and she was heavily influenced by fashion photography, Andy Warhol’s early films, Federico Fellini, French and Italian Vogue, Larry Clark,  Guy Bourdin and Helmut Newton. Her celebratory black-and-white photographs of drag queens prefigure her later signature cibachrome work such as The Ballad of Sexual Dependency.

Details
When she was 19, Goldin lived in downtown Boston where she began documenting her life in the subcultural community she made home. It was during her time there that her interest in photography solidified. She frequented The Other Side, a drag bar, where she became acquainted with the drag queens and transsexuals who later became the principal subjects for her photographs.

In this photograph, Ivy is in drag with a long-haired wig cascading behind her, epitomizing the sexual freedom and gender fluidity that Goldin admired. Goldin has said that she wanted to show respect and honor drag queens by portraying them as a “third gender, as another sexual option, a gender option.”

Notes

See also
 1973 in art
 Nan Goldin

1973 works
1973 in art
Black-and-white photographs
LGBT art in the United States
1973 in LGBT history
1970s photographs